The 1996 World Short Track Speed Skating Team Championships was the 6th edition of the World Short Track Speed Skating Team Championships which took place on 31 March 1996 in Lake Placid, United States.

Medal winners

Results

Men

Women

External links
Results
 Results in ISU's database
 Results book

World Short Track Speed Skating Team Championships
1996 World Short Track Speed Skating Team Championships